"The One with the Jellyfish" is the first episode of Friends fourth season. It first aired on the NBC network in the United States on September 25, 1997.

Plot
Leaving off where Season 3 ended, Ross is in the hallway between two bedrooms. One is the room he is sharing with Bonnie; the other, Rachel's room. He picks a door – and finds both Rachel and Bonnie sitting on Rachel's bed. Bonnie's bald head got sunburned, so Rachel is helping her rub some aloe on. After Bonnie leaves, Ross and Rachel kiss – and Ross leaves to break up with Bonnie. Rachel writes Ross a long letter ("Eighteen  pages! Front and back!") about their relationship and asks him to read it – but he falls asleep while doing so. After he wakes up, Rachel asks him if he agrees with what she wrote. Ross says he does, and the two reconcile. He later finds the part in the letter she is asking about – for him to accept full responsibility for their breakup and sleeping with Chloe – and immediately disagrees with it, still stuck on the fact that she was the one who suggested they "were on a break." After Rachel goes on about how Ross is so great for accepting responsibility, Ross cannot hide his feelings anymore. He reveals he never finished the letter, and ends up criticizing her grammar before they angrily break up again.

Phoebe is upset after Phoebe Abbott told her the truth about being her mother. Older Phoebe explains she was in a three-way sexual relationship with Lily and Frank, and after Frank (Phoebe's father) had gotten her pregnant, she was so young and scared and ultimately believed Ursula and younger Phoebe would be better off with Frank and Lily. An angry Phoebe declares she never wants to see her real mother again, and soon goes to Ursula's apartment to tell her about their mom – but Ursula already knows. She even produces a "suicide note" supposedly left by Lily – that Ursula herself writes while Phoebe is waiting in the hall. Phoebe Sr. comes into Central Perk to try and reconcile with Phoebe – who is not having any of it. Phoebe Sr. finally gets younger Phoebe to change her mind, by pointing out that she came to the beach looking for family – and found it. Phoebe then softens up to her birth mother upon finding out they have similar interests and they go off to have dinner together.

While Chandler, Monica and Joey are enjoying the beach now that it has finally stopped raining, Chandler still tries to convince Monica he would make a great boyfriend. Chandler and Monica go check out Joey's hole – and Monica gets stung by a jellyfish. Joey, remembering a documentary he saw on jellyfish that mentions a cure for jellyfish stings – urine – and prompts Monica to try peeing on herself. After being uncomfortable around each other for a couple of days and refusing to talk about it afterwards, Joey, Chandler, and Monica reveal what happened after Monica got stung by the jellyfish. Monica tried to pee on her wound, but could not bend that way – so Joey stepped up. Unfortunately, Joey got stage fright – leaving Chandler to do the dirty work. At the end of the episode, Chandler again asks why Monica will not consider going out with him. She says that while she thinks he is a great guy, he will always be "the guy who peed on me."

Reception
Purple Clover placed the episode on their list of "20 Funniest Episodes of Friends".

GamesRadar+ chose "The One with the Jellyfish" as one of the 25 best Friends episodes ever.

The website Digital Spy ranked it the sixth best Friends episode, and wrote that it was one of the show's best season openers.

Radio Times ranked "The One with the Jellyfish" the eighth funniest Friends episode.

References

1997 American television episodes
Friends (season 4) episodes